Hjulström is a Swedish surname. Notable people with the surname include:

 Carin Hjulström (born 1963), Swedish television presenter, journalist and writer
 Embla Hjulström (born 1994), Swedish actress
 Filip Hjulström (1902–1982), Swedish geographer
 Hjulström curve
 Lennart Hjulström (1938–2022), Swedish actor and film director
 Niklas Hjulström (born 1962), Swedish actor, singer and film director

Swedish-language surnames